Corwin C. Tuggles (born November 13, 1992) is an American actor. He was the singing voice of Tyrone on The Backyardigans during its first season.  On Broadway, he was in Caroline, or Change, and Dr. Seuss' How the Grinch Stole Christmas!. He has also done commercials for FluMist, Mercedes Benz, Pee wee Football, Target, Progressive Corporation, NBA, Comcast, Totinos Pizza Rolls, and more.

External links

1992 births
Living people
American male child actors
American child singers
Place of birth missing (living people)
American male television actors
American male stage actors
21st-century American singers